The 2nd Goya Awards were presented in Madrid, Spain on 22 March 1988.

The Enchanted Forest won the award for Best Film.

Winners and nominees

Major award nominees

Other award nominees

Honorary Goya
Rafaela Aparicio

External links
Official website (Spanish)
IMDb profile 

02
1987 film awards
1987 in Spanish cinema